The 2007-08 IIHF European Women's Champions Cup was the fourth season of the IIHF European Women's Champions Cup tournament. Reigning champions AIK IF Solna from Stockholm, Sweden claimed their fourth consecutive cup title in the Super Final.

Qualification

Group A

Group B

Group C

Group D

Second round

Group E

Group F

Super Final

References 
 
 

Women
IIHF European Women's Champions Cup
Euro